Jiskra (a Czech word meaning "spark") may refer to:

People
 John Jiskra of Brandýs ( – ), Czech strategist and mercenary soldier
 Markus Jiskra, Swiss international taekwondo player who competed in the 2008 Olympics

Czech sports clubs
 DSO Jiskra Gottwaldov, ice hockey, former name of PSG Berani Zlín
 FK Jiskra Třeboň, football
 Jiskra Gottwaldov, football, former name of FC Fastav Zlín
 Jiskra Liberec, football, defunct
 Jiskra Otrokovice, football, former name of SK Baťov 1930
 Jiskra Staré Město, football, former name of 1. FC Slovácko
 Jiskra Varnsdorf, football, former name of FK Varnsdorf
 TJ Jiskra Domažlice, football, former name of FK Jablonec
 TJ Jiskra Jablonec nad Nisou, football
 TJ Jiskra Jaroměř, football, former name of FK Jaroměř
 TJ Jiskra Ústí nad Orlicí, football

See also
 

Surnames of Czech origin